Fairy Glen is a hamlet in the Rural Municipality of Willow Creek No. 458 in the province of Saskatchewan, Canada. A "Faerie Glen" also exists in Scotland, and another near Pretoria, South Africa.

Demographics 

References 

Designated places in Saskatchewan
Organized hamlets in Saskatchewan
Willow Creek No. 458, Saskatchewan
Division No. 14, Saskatchewan